The year 1928 in archaeology involved some significant events.

Explorations
 American astronomer and University of Arizona professor A. E. Douglass participates in a National Geographic Society research project under Neil Merton Judd exploring Chaco Canyon. Using his newly invented technique of dendrochronology, Douglass dates Chetro Ketl and dozens of Chacoan sites (through 1929).
 Tell Arpachiyah in Iraq explored by Reginald Campbell Thompson.

Excavations
 September: John Garstang conducts first excavations at Et-Tell.
 September–October: Porlock Stone Circle on Exmoor in England surveyed by Harold St George Gray.
 Italian archaeologist Luigi Maria Ugolini begins excavations at Buthrotum in Epirus (modern-day Albania).
 V. Gordon Childe begins excavations at Skara Brae.
 Stuart Piggott begins excavations at Butser Hill.
 Marthe and Saint-Just Péquart begin excavation of Mesolithic sites on the Breton island of Téviec.
 The first excavations begin at Yinxu, China led by Li Chi of the Chinese Institute of History and Philosophy.
 Chinese archeologist Pei Wenzhong joins the continuing excavations at Peking Man site in Zhoukoudian, China.
 Excavations at Beit Shemesh (continue to 1931).
 Gertrude Caton Thompson begins excavations at Great Zimbabwe.
 Dorothy Garrod excavates cave sites in Judea and south Kurdistan.
 A Deutsche Orient-Gesellschaft and University of Pennsylvania team led by Oscar Reuther begins excavations at Ctesiphon.
 John Winter Crowfoot begins excavations of early Christian churches at Jerash (Gerasa) in Transjordan (continue to 1930).
 Mortimer Wheeler begins excavations at Lydney Park (continues to 1929).

Finds
 Continuing excavations at Peking Man Site in Zhoukoudian, China led by Davidson Black uncover more fossils of a new species he dubs Sinanthropus pekinensis.
 Ruins of Ugarit.
 First traces of Mal'ta–Buret' culture found in Siberia.
 First inscriptions of Byblos syllabary excavated by Maurice Dunand.

Publications
 V. Gordon Childe - The Most Ancient East: the oriental prelude to European prehistory.
 O. G. S. Crawford and Alexander Keiller - Wessex from the Air (Oxford).

Miscellaneous
 Davidson Black founds the Cenozoic Research Laboratory for the research and appraisal of fossils unearthed at Peking Man Site in Zhoukoudian, China
 Rosicrucian Egyptian Museum inaugurated in San Jose, California

Births
February 2: Stanley South, American archaeologist; author of Method and Theory in Historical Archaeology (1977) (died 2016)
March 8: Björn Ambrosiani, Swedish archaeologist
April 26: Charles Thomas, Cornish prehistorian (died 2016)
September 27: Margaret Rule, British maritime archaeologist (died 2015)

Deaths
Arthur Mace of the British archaeologist Howard Carter excavation team, said to have died of arsenic poisoning in 1928.

References

Archaeology
Archaeology
Archaeology by year